Spiff and Hercules is a French comic strip titled featuring an anthropomorphic brown-yellow dog named Spiff and a black-white cat named Hercules, who, despite being best friends, are constantly fighting in a friendship/hate relationship. The character Spiff was created by José Cabrero Arnal for the French Communist Party newspaper L'Humanité on 28 March 1948 and the cat Hercules was introduced two years later. The characters' nemesis is Krapulax, who despite his infant-like features always has a diabolical plot in store.

Spiff later got his own magazine Pif Gadget, which was very popular as not only did it include several different comic strips, but offered a toy gadget in each issue. He was also the magazine's mascot. Hercules also got his own version of Spiff's magazine, this one called Super Hercules, but his magazine was more joke-oriented. A series of 65 26-minute animated cartoons featuring the characters was produced in 1989 by Europe Images/M5 in France. Each program consisted of two episodes. United Kingdom television station Channel 4 aired the series in 1993. 

The adventures of Spiff also appeared as Spiff and Hercules in English translation in the British communist newspaper the Daily Worker (later The Morning Star) until the mid-1970s.

Animated series

Episodes
001. La guerre du feu 
002. Taxi folies 
003. Main basse sur l'orteil sacré 
004. Suspicion 
005. Farfouille s'embrouille 
006. A la poursuite du grodeoptère 
007. Ballade pour une valise 
008. Hold up on the rock 
009. Chercheurs d'or 
010. Coup dur pour la sculpture 
011. Pif détective 
012. Père Noël en stock 
013. La croisière infernale 
014. Hot dog mic mac 
015. Drôle de bobine 
016. Herculopolis 
017. Duel 
018. Chut bébé dort 
019. On a volé Sésame 
020. Grand hôtel 
021. Le match du siècle 
022. Mini plaies mini bosses 
023. Pif et la boule de cristal 
024. Du rififi sur l'île 
025. Le fakir va au tapis 
026. Les toqués de la grande cuisine 
027. Descente aux enfers 
028. Pif et Hercule au bagne 
029. Les as du ciel 
030. Nos amis les bêtes 
031. Les chevaliers de la Table Ronde 
032. Pif et Hercule vont au ciel 
033. Les vacances de Pif 
034. Obstruction votre honneur 
035. Farfouille suscite des vocations 
036. Le fantôme misanthrope 
037. Deux faux mages bien faits 
038. N'oubliez pas le guide 
039. Pôles d'attractions 
040. Les envahisseurs 
041. Têtes de l'art 
042. Jour de chance 
043. Pif et Hercule mènent la danse 
044. Incident spatio temporel 
045. Un peu mon neveu 
046. Scoop toujours 
047. C'est d'un commun 
048. Week-end à Zutcote 
049. Bon anniversaire 
050. Gare au gourou 
051. Hoquet choc 
052. Pifok contre Herculax 
053. Rien ne va plus au Matuvu 
054. Un bateau pour Noidkoko 
055. Le génie porte malheur 
056. L'invention du siècle 
057. Rubis sur l'ongle 
058. En avant marche 
059. Farfouille aux trousses 
060. Mieux vaut appeller un chat un chat 
061. L'héritage 
062. Boom sur le violon 
063. Promotion sur la prison 
064. Hallucinations 
065. Gros Talent a disparu  
066. À vot'service m'sieur Grochoux 
067. Farfouille et débrouille 
068. Baby sitting bull 
069. Viva Herculapatas 
070. Taxi cassé 
071. Rencontre du 3ème type 
072. La crise d'Hercule 
073. Les voies du ciel 
074. Le SAMU s'amuse 
075. Coquin de sort 
076. Hot dog party 
077. Faites un vœu qu'il disait 
078. Hercule chasse la prime 
079. Piques sous les tropiques 
080. Tour de piste 
081. Les mémoires d'Hercule 
082. Le maître du monde 
083. Pif et Hercule cascadeurs 
084. Yéti et chuchotement 
085. Le contrat 
086. Pif des bois 
087. Love story 
088. Casse à tous les étages 
089. Coup de froid 
090. Le casse du siècle 
091. Un amour de trésor 
092. Pif et Hercule gladiateurs 
093. La conquête de l'ouest 
094. Paris Sud 
095. Chaperon rouge et compagnie 
096. Bon appétit shérif 
097. Et que ça brille 
098. Pas de pitié pour les bronzés 
099. Les deux mousquetaires 
100. Cessez le feu 
101. Pif fait une cure 
102. Les drôles d'oiseaux 
103. Panique dans la bande 
104. Dépan télé 
105. L'île aux trésors 
106. La guerre des trois 
107. Hercule disparaît 
108. Du gag à la hune 
109. Souvenirs 
110. La guerre des robots 
111. Pif FM contre Radio Hercule 
112. Hercule fait fortune 
113. Astronautes 
114. Cancres et chouchoux 
115. Salade tyrolienne 
116. Le cauchemar de Farfouille 
117. Le coup du siècle 
118. Le blues sur le lagon 
119. Les frères de l'entrecôte 
120. Hercule se met à table 
121. Omnibus pour Roccoco 
122. Le grand sommeil 
123. Une partie de campagne 
124. Super Pif contre Super Herculeman 
125. Drôles de jeux 
126. Gare aux fantômes 
127. Aïe mon neveu 
128. Les travaux d'Hercule 
129. À l'aide les fans sont là 
130. Échec et mat pour Hercule

Outsourced production work
Studio S.E.K.

International titles
  (Arabic Title)
  (Arabic,Basma Channel Title)
  - Pif i Erkjul (Bulgarian Title)
 Pif a Herkules (Czech Title)
 Spiff and Hercules (English Title)
 Jeppe ja Kolli (Finnish Title)
 Pif et Hercules (French Title)
 Piff und Herkules (German Title)
  (Greek Title)
 Pif és Herkules (Hungarian Title)
 Pif dan di Herkule (Indonesia Title)
  (Piff VeTaltol) (Israeli Title)
 Pippo e Menelao (Italian Title)
 Pif i Herkules (Polish Title)
 Spiff e Hércules (Portuguese Title)
 Pif y Hércules (Spanish Title)
 Pif şi Hercule (Romanian Title)
 Pif och Hercule (Swedish Title)
 Pif ja Herkules / Jeppe ja Kolli (Finnish Title)
  (Russian Title)
 Pifa piedzīvojumi (Latvian Title)

References

1989 French television series debuts
1989 French television series endings
1980s French animated television series
French children's animated television series
Television series based on French comics
Channel 4 original programming
TF1 original programming
Animated television series about cats
Animated television series about dogs
French-language television shows